"You Can't Get a Man with a Gun" is a song from the 1946 musical Annie Get Your Gun, written by Irving Berlin. It was originally performed by Ethel Merman.

In the song, Annie Oakley sings about how a girl with talent as a sharpshooter nevertheless finds that her abilities do not help her attract men.  She introduces herself with: "I'm quick on the trigger/with targets not much bigger/than a pinpoint I'm number one." The song is humorous in that she imagines different scenarios in which shooting a man will not make him fall in love with you, e.g. "A man may be hot/but he's not/when he's shot/oh, you can't get a man with a gun!" and "But you can't shoot a lover,/and use him for a cover/oh, you can't get a man with a gun!"

Recordings 
 Doris Day - for her album Annie Get Your Gun (1963)
 Judy Garland - recorded for the film soundtrack but not used as Garland was subsequently dropped from the film.
 Eydie Gormé - for her album Gormé Sings Showstoppers (1959).
 Betty Hutton - included in the album Annie Get Your Gun (Original Soundtrack) (1950).
 Ethel Merman - included in Annie Get Your Gun [Original Cast Album] (1946).
 Björk - included in Gling-Gló (1990).
 Bernadette Peters - included in Annie Get Your Gun [1999 Broadway Revival Cast] (1999).
 Suzi Quatro – starred as Annie Oakley in the 1986 West End (London) production of Annie Get Your Gun. She sings the song in the album Annie Get Your Gun – 1986 London Cast (1986), and the associated single "I Got Lost in His Arms" (1986).

References 

Songs from Annie Get Your Gun
Songs written by Irving Berlin
1946 songs
Suzi Quatro songs
List songs